The 2013–14 season is Tuen Mun's 4th consecutive season in the Hong Kong First Division League, the top flight of Hong Kong football. Tuen Mun will compete in the First Division League, Senior Challenge Shield and FA Cup in this season. However, it is yet to confirmed whether they will compete in the 2014 AFC Cup as they reached the 2013 Hong Kong AFC Cup play-offs final against Kitchee.

Tuen Mun failed to qualify for their first ever Asian club competition as they lost 3–0 to Kitchee in the 2013 Hong Kong AFC Cup play-offs final.

Key events
 29 May 2013: The club confirmed that they have agreed deals with new sponsor for the next season. All foreign players are forced to leave as the club do not extend their contracts.
 29 May 2013: Hong Kong midfielder Chow Cheuk Fung joins fellow First Division club Biu Chun Rangers on loan until the end of the season.
 29 May 2013: The club confirms that Li Haiqiang and Kwok Wing Sun will leave the club after spending a season with the club.
 30 May 2013: The club confirms the departure of head coach Yan Lik Kin.
 4 June 2013: Hong Kong defender Cheng Ting Chi announces his retirement from professional football.
 11 June 2013: Brazilian midfielder Diego Eli Moreira leaves the club and joins newly promoted First Division club Eastern Salon for free.
 11 June 2013: Chinese-born Hongkonger midfielder Li Haiqiang leaves the club and joins newly promoted First Division club Eastern Salon for free.
 11 June 2013: Brazilian defender Beto leaves the club and joins newly promoted First Division club Eastern Salon for free.
 11 June 2013: Hong Kong defender Kwok Wing Sun leaves the club and joins newly promoted First Division club Eastern Salon for an undisclosed fee.
 4 July 2013: The club announces that 12 players will stay at the club, and is finding 4 Chinese players and 3 foreign players to strengthen the squad.
 18 July 2013: Chinese midfielder Hu Jun joins the club on loan from Chinese Super League club Qingdao Jonoon until the end of the season.
 18 July 2013: Chinese midfielder Feng Tao joins the club from Chinese non-league club Jiaozhou Anji Tower for an undisclosed fee.
 18 July 2013: Hong Kong defender Tsang Chiu Tat joins the club from fellow First Division club Royal Southern on a free transfer.
 22 August 2013: Unattached Croatian defender Petar Garvic joins the club on a free transfer.
 22 August 2013: Spanish striker Dani Sánchez joins the club from A-League club Wellington Phoenix FC on a free transfer.
 22 August 2013: Cameroonian striker Guy Madjo joins the club from English Conference Premier club Macclesfield Town on a free transfer.
 22 August 2013: Chinese defender Zheng Meng joins the club from Qingdao City Super League club Qingdao Kunpeng on a free transfer.
 13 November 2013: Chinese defender Yin Guangjun joins the club from on loan from Chinese Super League club Qingdao Jonoon until the end of the season.
 1 January 2014: Hong Kong defender Wong Chi Chung leaves the club and joins fellow First Division club Eastern Salon for an undisclosed fee.

Players

Squad information

Last update: 1 January 2014
Source: Tuen Mun SA
Ordered by squad number.
LPLocal player; FPForeign player; NRNon-registered player

Transfers

In

Out

Loan In

Loan out

Club

Coaching staff

Squad statistics

Overall Stats
{|class="wikitable" style="text-align: center;"
|-
!width="100"|
!width="60"|First Division
!width="60"|Senior Shield
!width="60"|FA Cup
!width="60"|Total Stats
|-
|align=left|Games played    ||  0  ||  0  || 0  || 0
|-
|align=left|Games won       ||  0  ||  0  || 0  || 0
|-
|align=left|Games drawn     ||  0  ||  0  || 0  || 0
|-
|align=left|Games lost      ||  0  ||  0  || 0  || 0
|-
|align=left|Goals for       ||  0  ||  0  || 0  || 0
|-
|align=left|Goals against   ||  0  ||  0  || 0  || 0
|- =
|align=left|Players used    ||  0  ||  0  || 0  || 01
|-
|align=left|Yellow cards    ||  0  ||  0  || 0  || 0
|-
|align=left|Red cards       ||  0  ||  0  || 0  || 0
|-

Players Used: Tuen Mun have used a total of 0 different players in all competitions.

Squad Stats

Top scorers

Disciplinary record

Starting 11
This will show the most used players in each position, based on Tuen Mun's typical starting formation once the season commences.

Captains

Competitions

Overall

First Division League

Classification

Results summary

Results by round

Matches

Pre-season friendlies

First Division League

Senior Shield

References

Tuen Mun SA seasons
Tuen